Romana Didulo is a Canadian false pretender who proclaimed herself to be the Queen of Canada, and later, Queen of the World. She is the leader of a fictitious government called the "Kingdom of Canada", led by the Canada1st Party, an unregistered political party in Canada of which she is the founder. She has granted herself the title of "Her Royal Highness". She is one of the most prominent figures of the QAnon movement in Canada and promotes other conspiracy theories such as the pseudolegal concepts derived from the sovereign citizen movement.

Early life 
Details about Didulo's early life are not well documented. Didulo emigrated from the Philippines to Canada at a young age. She claims on her website that she emigrated when she was 15, after losing both of her parents, and that she first came to the United States with her uncle.

Adult life 
From the early 2000s, Didulo started a number of unsuccessful business ventures. She said in one of her livestreams that she was homeless at some point, and slept on the floor in her friend's nail salon. She eventually became immersed in online conspiracy theories.

Didulo's public persona underwent a series of rapid changes since she started producing video interventions in 2020: leader of a non-registered political party called Canada1st, to head of state of a Canadian republic, to Queen of Canada with high-level extraterrestrial connections. She gained followers in 2021 after being endorsed by popular QAnon influencers. She claims her power is backed up by a secret faction within the American military, a common QAnon trope. According to Vice.com reporter Mack Lamoureux, Didulo's rise in popularity among QAnon adherents was made possible by the fact that "Q", the movement's originator, went silent in late 2020: this allowed Didulo to "[step] into the power vacuum".

Didulo lives in British Columbia; however, in 2022, she began travelling to various parts of Canada with a small group of supporters, receiving significant donations to fund her tour. According to those who travelled with her, Didulo exhibits authoritarian and abusive behaviour toward members of her team, with experts warning this fits some of the signifiers of a cult-like behaviour. Some volunteers who quit, or simply displeased her, were threatened with execution. Several of her former followers organized into a group that monitors her activities, warning communities she's travelling to.

Conspiracy theories and the Kingdom of Canada 
Because of her frequent calls for violent action, her proven ability to incite her followers to take concrete actions on her behalf, and her continuous attempts to establish a competing government to the internationally recognized one in Ottawa, she has been identified as one of the most dangerous QAnon influencers in Canada by researchers following the movement.

Didulo gained notoriety during the COVID-19 pandemic by demanding that all vaccines be destroyed, and promoting various conspiracy theories common to the QAnon universe. In response to her exhortations, some of her followers expressed the desire to violently attack health care professionals and public officials. Her rhetoric appeared to become less violent throughout 2022, but in early 2023 she called on her followers to fire on groups of migrants at the Canada-U.S. border.

Didulo has not been universally adopted within the QAnon movement, with some influencers warning she might be a government operative tasked with discrediting the movement. She responds by threatening her detractors with execution. She joined the 2022 convoy protest in Ottawa where she was met with a hostile reaction when she attempted to burn a Canadian flag, prompting her to denounce the demonstrators she intended to join.

Didulo has made a number of unsubstantiated claims, such as the claim that she is an extraterrestrial with access to secret, New Age healing technology, that she has abolished utility bills or other debts and has ended adrenochrome extraction in Canada.

To effectuate these claims, Didulo has issued a number of what she calls "decrees" supposedly outlawing various actions by governments and financial institutions. She urges her followers to use pseudo-legal documents using language developed by the sovereign citizen movement to avoid paying debts, or to pressure businesses into dropping public health measures. A large number of businesses, schools and others received "cease and desist" documents. Several creditors have taken legal actions against her followers, in several cases leaving them at risk of losing their homes. Christine Sarteschi, an academic studying extremist movements, has been tracking cases trickling through the court system where creditors have foreclosure actions enforced against Didulo followers who stop making their mortgage or utilities payments.

Didulo started issuing her own money in March 2023. Referring to sovereign citizen rhetoric, she started handing out the pieces of paper representing unspecified currency to her close followers as a first step to a more general distribution. Several of her fans said they were hoping to use the bills to pay for housing and other necessities,  even though Didulo isn't claiming that would be possible. She nevertheless requested more donations to continue printing her currency, claiming it will make every Canadian rich in the future.

Didulo's caravan is funded by donations from her followers, some making large monthly donations even while facing foreclosure. The number of people who were subscribing to Didulo's Telegram account varies, but is most commonly estimated at 60,000 or 70,000. She regularly solicits donations through social media. In August 2022, these fundraising efforts included a video message that was presented as an endorsement and fundraising pitch from Roger Stone. Stone's lawyer intervened to deny his client had anything to do with Didulo, Stone himself warning his Telegram followers the campaign was "a scam".

Police issues 
In November 2021, Didulo was briefly detained by officers of the Royal Canadian Mounted Police's Integrated National Security Enforcement Teams and subjected to a psychiatric evaluation after she incited her followers to "shoot to kill" health care providers who vaccinate minors against COVID-19. According to Didulo, the RCMP also seized computer equipment.

On August 13, 2022, a group of approximately 30 of Didulo's followers attempted to enter the headquarters of the Peterborough, Ontario police in an attempt to seize police officers in what they characterized as a citizen's arrest for "COVID crimes" (enforcing COVID-19 restrictions). Didulo herself did not participate aside from addressing the demonstration from a vehicle parked nearby. Despite her claims, no military forces appeared to help detain the police officers. The confrontation with officers resulted in six demonstrators being arrested. Didulo later attempted to distance herself from that incident by claiming during one of her livestreams that she had been present in Peterborough as "an observer" and not a participant. And investigation into claims made by a 55-year-old Didulo supporter that he was seriously injured during the arrest was closed in December 2022 after the complainant refused to provide evidence to the Special Investigations Unit.

Peterborough mayor Diane Therrien became embroiled in a minor controversy after stating "fuck off, you fuckwads." on social media, in reaction to the group's actions.

See also 
 COVID-19 misinformation in Canada
 Freeman on the land
 Self-proclaimed monarchy
 Timeline of incidents involving QAnon

Notes

References

Further reading 
 QAnon's “Queen of Canada” is organizing harassment on streets across the country, CityNews, June 25, 2021.

Living people
Activists from British Columbia
Canadian conspiracy theorists
Canadian anti-vaccination activists
Canadian women activists
COVID-19 conspiracy theorists
COVID-19 pandemic in Canada
Filipino emigrants to Canada
Filipino emigrants to the United States
Monarchy in Canada
Protesters involved in the Canada convoy protest
Pretenders
QAnon
Self-proclaimed monarchy
Social media influencers
Sovereign citizen movement individuals
Date of birth missing (living people)
Year of birth missing (living people)
Place of birth missing (living people)